Osijek Campaign of 1685 was a successful Habsburg-Croatian incursion towards the town of Osijek in Ottoman held Slavonia. Although the campaign inside enemy territory ended in a tactical victory for Habsburg-Croatian troops, James Leslie - the general in charge, decided for a tactical withdrawal after reaching Osijek and defeating one Ottoman army there, because he lacked sufficient resources to besiege the Osijek's main fort.

Prelude 
After the Ottoman Empire attempted to besiege Vienna in 1683 and failed in its intention, the Holy League was formed, and allied Christian powers decided to begin the Great Turkish War against the Ottoman Empire. In the Croatian-Slavonian theater of operations, the army of Croatian ban (viceroy), commanded by general James Leslie, (a Scotsman in service of Habsburg Imperial Army) successfully captured the town of Virovitica in 1684 and turned it into an outpost for further incursions inside Slavonia. 

In August 1685, Leslie again assembled his army and began another campaign, this time deeper inside Ottoman-held Slavonia.

The Incursion 

On August 9, Leslie's army began another thrust inside Slavonia towards Osijek. At a time, this Slavonian town was a vital Ottoman hub in the region and also an important crossroad that connected the roads leading from Slavonia to Hungary. Leslie's army, however, progressed slowly due to the scorching summer heat. Two days later, a vanguard of 500 cavalrymen commanded by captain Gašpar Balog attacked Miholjac, whose garrison quickly surrendered to Balog. He then captured prisoners shut inside a tower and assigned 300 soldiers to guard them.

On August 12, the main army under Leslie's command reached Karašica river, where they encamped. At 10 in the morning, the vanguard informed Leslie of Ottoman troops marching out from Osijek and heading towards them, so Leslie prepared maneuvers. He instructed his men to fire their cannons and march in different directions to make it look as if they were larger in number than they really were. In the meantime, Leslie learned from a peasant that a few days ago, Ottoman troops had indeed marched out from Osijek to Valpovo. Still, when they found out about the presence of Leslie's army, they pulled back across the Karašica river. 

Not wanting to allow Ottomans to burn down any bridge across Karašica, the cavalrymen of the Croatian vanguard charged at these Turks and inflicted losses on them. In this bloody skirmish Ivanić, captain Stjepan Patačić and dozens of other men were killed. However, the Ottomans ultimately withdrew behind the safety of the Osijek walls.

The Battle of Osijek 
On August 13, Leslie's main army reached Osijek and encamped there. He again erected a large camp for 30,000 men to make it look like his army was larger than it really was. He formed his army in battle order by positioning his infantry, German cavalry, chamber, and artillery in the center while placing his Croatian cavalry on both flanks. The Ottoman army consisting of infantry and cavalry, came out to meet them and formed their own battle line. The two armies then started slowly approaching each other. When they came really close, Croatian cavalry swiftly attacked both flanks of the enemy army, routing them. As Croatians continued to pursue them, the Ottoman troops withdrew in panic inside the Osijek fort. Meanwhile, Leslie's main army continued to approach them while maintaining their battle order until they reached the palanka of Osijek. 

On August 14, Leslie continued the reconnaissance around Osijek and ordered some 13 nearby water mills to be burnt down. He also decided to burn down the wooden Suleiman bridge across the Drava river near Osijek.

The Aftermath 
Since he lacked resources to besiege the main Osijek fort, Leslie first had the Osijek palanka burnt down, then decided to retreat his army back to Virovitica on August 14 due to the concern of being cut off from behind. On the morning of August 15, his army completed the withdrawal. The word of Leslie's success near Osijek soon spread around Europe, so the bishop of Passau, for example, held a thanksgiving mass upon hearing the news. The news also reached Milan, where commemorative flyers about the offensive were printed.

References 
Battles of the Great Turkish War
Battles involving Croatia
17th-century military history of Croatia